was a Japanese domain of the Edo period. It was associated with Chikugo Province in modern-day Fukuoka Prefecture on the island of Kyushu.

In the han system, Kurume was a political and economic abstraction based on periodic cadastral surveys and projected agricultural yields.  In other words, the domain was defined in terms of kokudaka, not land area. This was different from the feudalism of the West.

List of daimyōs 
The hereditary daimyōs were head of the clan and head of the domain.  At Kurume, the Tokugawa shōguns granted 210,000 koku to the Arima clan from 1620 to 1868.

 Arima clan, 1620–1868 (fudai; 210,000 koku)
 , 1620–1642
 , 1642–1655
 , 1655–1668 
 , 1668–1705 
 , 1705–1706
 , 1706–1729 
 , 1729–1783
 , 1784–1812
 , 1812–1844 
 , 1844–1846
 , 1846–1871
 
The Arima clan leaders became viscounts in the Meiji period.

Genealogy (simplified)

Arima Noriyori, Lord of Sanda (1533–1602)
 I. Toyouji, 1st daimyō of Kurume (cr. 1620) (1569–1642; r. 1620–1642)
 II. Tadayori, 2nd daimyō of Kurume (1603–1655; r. 1642–1655)
 III. Yoritoshi, 3rd daimyō of Kurume (1652–1668; r. 1655–1668)
 IV. Yorimoto, 4th daimyō of Kurume (1654–1705; r. 1668–1705)
 V. Yorimune, 5th daimyō of Kurume (1685–1706; r. 1705–1706)
 A daughter, who m. Ishino (Akamatsu) Ujimitsu (1553–1606)
 Akamatsu
 Ishino
 Ishino
 Ishino Norikazu
 VI. Arima Norifusa, 6th daimyō of Kurume (1674–1738; r. 1707–1729)
 VII. Yoriyuki, 7th daimyō of Kurume (1714–1783; r. 1729–1783)
 VIII. Yoritaka, 8th daimyō of Kurume (1746–1812; r. 1783–1812)
 Yorinao (1779-1805)
 IX. Yorinori, 9th daimyō of Kurume (1797–1844; r. 1812–1844)
 X. Yorito, 10th daimyō of Kurume (1822–1846; r. 1844–1846)
 XI. Yorishige, 11th daimyō, 1st Governor (1828–1893; daimyō: 1846–1869; Governor: 1869–1871)
 Yoritsumu, 1st Count (1864–1927; Count: 1884)
 Yoriyasu, 2nd Count (1884–1957; Count: 1927–1947)
 Yorichika (1918–1980)
 Yorinaka (b. 1959)

See also 
 List of Han
 Abolition of the han system

References

External links
 "Kurume" at Edo 300 

Domains of Japan
Kurume
1871 disestablishments in Japan
History of Fukuoka Prefecture